Kiril Andreev (born 29 December 1983) is a Bulgarian football player, currently playing for FC Malesh Mikrevo as a midfielder

External links
 

1983 births
Living people
Bulgarian footballers
First Professional Football League (Bulgaria) players
Association football midfielders